The 2009 Autism Speaks 400 presented by Heluva Good! was the thirteenth points race in the 2009 NASCAR Sprint Cup season, marking the halfway point to the 2009 Chase for the Sprint Cup, and was held at the  Dover International Speedway in Delaware's state capital city May 31 of that year, consisting of .

Background
Fox Sports, in its 2009 swan song, televised the race beginning at 1:30 PM US EDT while MRN (terrestrial) and Sirius XM Radio (satellite) handled radio coverage starting at 1 PM.

The biggest change that year at Dover was a new pit road area. Previously, Dover's pit road only had enough room for 42 pit stalls, meaning one team had to share a pit until a car dropped out of the race.

Pre-Race News
The biggest news this week concerned the Hendrick Motorsports #88 team of Dale Earnhardt Jr.  His cousin and crew chief, Tony Eury Jr., who had come with him from Dale Earnhardt Inc. (now Earnhardt Ganassi Racing) two years ago in one of the biggest events of that Silly Season, was fired.  He will be replaced for the next two races with manager Brian Whitesell.  Lance Magrew, a veteran crew chief will take over at Michigan.

Entry list

Qualifying
Jeff Gordon wrecked his car in the first run of qualifying.  David Reutimann, winner of the previous week's rain-shortened Coca-Cola 600 took his third career pole.

Failed to Qualify: Brad Keselowski (#25), Max Papis (#13), Derrike Cope (#75), David Starr (#06).

Race recap
The Jimmie Johnson #48 Lowe's team chose a rather unusual strategy: they chose the last pit stall (the newly designated 43rd pit stall).  It worked to a charm as he led the most laps (298), and made the win with a pass of Tony Stewart with three laps to go and claim the win coming from seventh place on the final pit stop under caution that had earlier cost them the lead.

Race results

References

Autism Speaks 400
Autism Speaks 400
Sociological and cultural aspects of autism
NASCAR races at Dover Motor Speedway
May 2009 sports events in the United States